{{DISPLAYTITLE:C6H9NO2}}
The molecular formula C6H9NO2 (molar mass: 127.14 g/mol, exact mass: 127.0633 u) may refer to:

 2,5-Bis(hydroxymethyl)pyrrole
 Guvacine
 Isoguvacine

Molecular formulas